Maharani Prem Kaur, was the queen consort of Maharaja Sher Singh, the fourth Maharaja of the Sikh Empire. She was the daughter of Lambardar Hari Singh Warraich a Jat Sikh of the village of Ladhewala Waraich, in Gujranwala district of the Punjab, In 1822 she was married to Prince Sher Singh, the elder of the twins of Maharani Mehtab Kaur and Maharaja Ranjit Singh, founder of the Sikh Empire.

In 1831, she gave birth to Shahzada Partap Singh.  Installed as Heir Apparent with the title of Tika Sahib Yuvraj Bahadur (Crown Prince) at Lahore Fort, 27th January 1841. He was later brutally murdered by Sardar Lahina Singh Sandhanvalia, near Shalamar Bagh in Lahore on September 15, 1843 at the age of 12. Rani Prem Kaur survived her husband and was granted an annual pension of Rs 7,200 by the British after the Annexation of Punjab Sikh Kingdom by the British Raj in 1849.

Sher Singh was succeeded by his five year old brother, Duleep Singh as the Maharaja and his mother, Jind Kaur as regent.

References 

Indian female royalty
Women of the Sikh Empire
19th-century Indian women
19th-century Indian people